Facing the Animal is the tenth studio album by guitarist Yngwie Malmsteen, released in 1997 through Pony Canyon (Japan) and Mercury Records (United States). The album reached No. 20 on the Finnish albums chart and No. 39 on the Swedish albums chart.

Although credited to Malmsteen, "Air on a Theme" is an arrangement of the second movement (Largo) of Antonio Vivaldi's "Piccolo Concerto in C Major (RV443)". Facing the Animal features one of drummer Cozy Powell's last performances before his death in April 1998.

Critical reception

Stephen Thomas Erlewine gave Facing the Animal three stars out of five, saying that "much of the record is stronger than anything Malmsteen has recorded in years" but also calling it "predictable, from the rockers to the power ballads".

Track listing

Personnel
Yngwie Malmsteen – guitar, bass (tracks 1, 4, 6, 12), background vocals, arrangement, production
Mats Levén – lead vocals (except track 13)
Mats Olausson – keyboards
Cozy Powell – drums (except track 13)
Barry Dunaway – bass (except tracks 1, 4, 6, 12, 13)
Chris Tsangarides – engineering, mixing, production
Keith Rose – engineering assistance
Rod Fuller – mastering

Chart performance

Certifications

References

External links
Facing the Animal, 1997 at yngwiemalmsteen.com

Yngwie Malmsteen albums
1997 albums
Albums produced by Chris Tsangarides
Pony Canyon albums
Mercury Records albums